Lautaro Schinnea (born 14 December 1995) is an Argentine professional footballer who plays as a forward for Napoli United.

Career
Schinnea began with Defensores de Belgrano in 2008. He made appearances for the Belgrano outfit in league and cup from 2013, notably featuring in their promotion-winning campaign of 2014 from Primera C Metropolitana. In January 2015, Schinnea completed a move to Aldosivi of the Primera División. He remained for eighteen months but didn't make a first-team appearance. Schinnea was signed by Primera B Metropolitana's Fénix on 30 June 2016. His debut arrived on 28 November against Deportivo Español, in a season which saw him score his opening goal versus Comunicaciones in the succeeding May.

In 2018, after four goals in two seasons for Fénix, Schinnea joined fellow third tier team Acassuso. Twenty-one appearances followed without a goal, though he did only start six times in that period. In July 2019, fellow Primera B Metropolitana team JJ Urquiza signed Schinnea. In January 2020, Schinnea switched Argentina for Italy after penning terms with Promozione side Santegidiese. He scored three goals in the next few months, including a brace against US Miano, before the season's curtailment due to COVID-19. Despite renewing his contract in June, he left in December to Afragolese of Serie D. After one month - and only one appearance in Serie D - Schinnea left Afragolese again and joined Biancavilla 1990 on 9 January 2021. Later during the first months of 2021, Schinnea moved to Eccellenza side Napoli United.

Career statistics
.

References

External links

1995 births
Living people
Place of birth missing (living people)
Argentine footballers
Association football forwards
Argentine expatriate footballers
Expatriate footballers in Italy
Argentine expatriate sportspeople in Italy
Primera C Metropolitana players
Primera B Metropolitana players
Promozione players
Defensores de Belgrano footballers
Aldosivi footballers
Club Atlético Fénix players
Club Atlético Acassuso footballers
Asociación Social y Deportiva Justo José de Urquiza players
Santegidiese Calcio S.S.D. players